The Herring Song, also known as Bolliton Sands, The Red Herring and Jolly red herring is a folk-song (Roud 128) found in various forms and believed to be associated with the once-thriving herring-fishing industry in the North Sea.  Several different variants of the song are known. A version of "The Red Herring" which was collected at South Zeal is included in the Baring-Gould manuscripts.

References

External links
Folk Song Information: Jolly red herring
The Red Herring

English folk songs
Year of song unknown
Cumulative songs
Songwriter unknown